Goode (  or  , depending on family) is a middle name and surname of English origins. People with this name may include:

People with the middle name Goode 
 Lucy Goode Brooks (1818–1900), American slave who was instrumental in the founding of the Friends' Asylum for Colored Orphans
 Eslanda Goode Robeson (c. 1895 – 1965), American anthropologist, author, actor and civil rights activist
 Henry Goode Blasdel (1825–1900), American politician

People with the surname Goode

A 
 Adam Goode (born 1983), American politician
 Agnes Goode (1872–1947), Australian social and political activist
 Alex Goode (Born 1988), British rugby union player
 Alexander D. Goode (1911–1943), US Army chaplain
 Andy Goode (born 1980), British rugby union player
 Andy Goode (badminton) (born 1960), English badminton player
 Arthur Frederick Goode III (1954–1984), American murderer

B 
 Barry Goode (born 1948), American judge in Contra Costa County, California
 Benjamin Goode (1924–2014), Australian cricketer
 Bertram Goode (1886–1955), English footballer
 Brad Goode (born 1963), American jazz trumpeter, bassist, drummer, composer and music educator
 Brett Goode (born 1984), American football player

C 
 Cameron Goode (born 1998), American football player
 Caroline Goode, British retired police detective
 Charles Henry Goode (1827–1922) Australian merchant and philanthropist, founder of Goode, Durrant and Co.
 Charles Rufus Goode (1844–1913), pastoralist and politician in South Australia
 Charlie Goode (born 1995), English association football player
 Chris Goode (disambiguation)
 Chris Goode (born 1963), NFL Player 1987-1993 Indianapolis Colts
 Clarence Goode (1875–1969) South Australian farmer and politician
 Coleridge Goode (1914–2015), Jamaican British jazz musician
 Conrad Goode (born 1962), American football player

D 
 Daniel Goode (born 1936), American composer and clarinetist
 David Goode (disambiguation)
 David Goode (organist) (born 1971), British organist
 David Goode (sculptor) (born 1966), British sculptor
 David R. Goode, retired CEO of Norfolk Southern Corporation
 Dewey Goode (1898–1972), American politician
 Dunny Goode (1929–2004), American football coach

E 
 Elena Goode (born 1982), American actress who stars on the daytime soap As The World Turns
 Eric Goode (born 1957), American businessman and film director
 Erich Goode, American sociologist

F 
 Frank Goode (born 1939), Australian rules footballer

G 
 George Brown Goode (1851–1896), American ichthyologist
 Gigi Goode (born 1997), American drag queen
 Graham Goode (disambiguation)

H 
 Harry Goode (disambiguation)
 Harry C. Goode Jr. (1938–2013), American politician
 Harry H. Goode (1909–1960), American engineer
 Harry King Goode (1892–1942), British World War I flying ace

J 
 James Goode (born 1982), Welsh rugby player
 James Moore Goode (1939–2019), American architectural historian
 Jamie Goode, British wine writer
 Jason Goode (born 1986), American football player
 Jeff Goode, American television show creator
 Jeremy Goode (born 1972), English cricketer
 Jim Goode (1944–2016), American businessperson
 Joanne Goode (born 1972), former British badminton player
 Joe Goode (born 1937), American artist and painter
 John Goode (disambiguation)
 John Goode (Virginia politician) (1829–1909), American politician
 John Paul Goode (1862–1932), American geographer
 John W. Goode (1923–1994), American lawyer and Republican politician

K 
 Katherine Hancock Goode (1872–1928), American teacher, teacher educator, administrator, and state legislator
 Kerry Goode (born 1965), American football player

L 
 Lynda Tolbert-Goode (born 1967), American hurdler

M 
 Malvin Russell Goode (born 1908), African-American television journalist
 Mary Goode (born 1979), field hockey goalkeeper from Ireland
 Matthew Goode (born 1978), British actor
 Matthew Goode (1820–1901), founder of Matthew Goode and Co., an Australian softgoods wholesaler
 Michael Goode (born 1952), British cross-country skier
 Milton Goode (born 1960), American high jumper
 Morton G. Goode (1886–1959), American politician

N 
 Najee Goode (born 1989), American football player

P 
 P. Wayne Goode (1937–2010), American politician
 Patrick Gaines Goode (1798–1862), American lawyer, and legislator
 P. Wayne Goode (1937–2020), American politician

R 
 Richard Goode (born 1943), American classical pianist
 Richard Urquhart Goode (1858–1903), American geographer
 Roger Goode, South African DJ
 Royal Goode (1913–1978), Swedish chess player
 Roy Goode (born 1933), British lawyer

S 
 Samuel Goode (disambiguation)
 Sarah E. Goode (born 1850), first African American woman to get a US patent
 Sebastian Goode (born c. 1599), English politician who sat in the House of Commons
 Steven Goode (disambiguation)

T 
 Terry Goode (born 1961), English former professional footballer
 Thomas Goode (disambiguation)
 Thomas Goode (merchant) (1816–1882), Australian merchant
 Tom Goode (disambiguation)
 Tom Goode (footballer) (1938–2015), American football player, coach, and administrator
 Tom Goode (politician) (1900–1983), Canadian politician* Virgil Goode (born 1946), American politician

W 
 W. Wilson Goode Jr. (born 1965), Philadelphia City Councilman
 Washington Goode (1820–1849), American murderer
 William Goode (disambiguation)
 William Goode, the elder (1762–1816), English Evangelical Anglican clergyman
 William Allmond Codrington Goode, British colonial administrator
 Wilson Goode (born 1938), former Mayor of Philadelphia
 Woodrow Wilson Goode (disambiguation)

See also 

 Goode (disambiguation)
 Good (surname)
 Lynda Tolbert-Goode (born 1967), American hurdler and sprinter

Surnames of English origin